Cecil John Rhodes Barror (12 August 1911 – 15 October 1999) was an Irish barrister, actor and broadcaster. He was a member of the Abbey Theatre from 1936–79.

Born in Clontarf, Dublin, Barror was married in 1942 to Ethna Graham who formed and conducted The Lindsay Singers, a choir that gained an international reputation. They had three sons and two daughters; the youngest Tony died at the age of 21 years in 1976.

In 1947 he was in a Radio Éireann production of a play by Irish playwright Teresa Deevy called Dignity.

Barror died in 1999 and is buried in Glasnevin Cemetery.

Filmography

References

External links 
 Cecil Barror at the Abbey Theatre Archive
 Cecil Barror at the Teresa Deevy Archive

20th-century Irish male actors
1911 births
1999 deaths
Irish barristers
Irish male radio actors
Male actors from Dublin (city)